The Owens-Rogers Museum, was the home of Hollywood screenwriter and producer Lela Rogers and is the birthplace and childhood home of the American actress, dancer, and singer, Ginger Rogers. The home was a tourist attraction and museum and is located in Independence, Missouri, United States, at 100 W Moore Street. This small craftsman style bungalow was built between 1906 and 1910 by Oscar Mindrup, a local real estate investor, banker, and city councilman. This site is the birthplace of Hollywood film actress/dancer Ginger Rogers. Virginia Katherine McMath (Ginger) was born on July 16, 1911, to Lela Owens McMath, who was estranged from her husband. The house is no longer under the control of the museum, which had to close in May 2020. The owners have plans to create a digital online version of the museum in 2020.

Usage 
Lela Owens-McMath rented the home and she and Ginger likely lived here for approximately four years. Lela insisted on having her baby at home because she lost her first child in a hospital when the doctor used forceps. She obtained employment as a typist on July 15 at the Sand Company, promising to appear for duty in early August. On her way home from the job interview, Lela went into labor and had to walk home while doubling over in pain. She stopped at a drugstore to call the doctor and met him at the house. The next day, Ginger was born.

Lela later married John Rogers, and Ginger took his last name as her stage name. Lela became a scriptwriter, screenwriter (under the name Lela Leibrand), author, and producer, and was heavily involved in the theater. Ginger appeared in her first newspaper advertisement at age 18 months. Ginger learned 
Vaudeville at a young age while watching from the wings in theatres. She won the Texas State Charleson Contest at age 15, then went on to become a Broadway star at the age of 19, and shortly after, a Hollywood film actress. Lela Rogers was Gingers agent and manager for most of her career. Ginger Rogers made 73 films and starred in Broadway productions, in radio and TV shows, and her traveling nightclub act called The Ginger Rogers Show. Ginger Rogers is perhaps best known for the ten films she made with Fred Astaire, but she was a huge star before they began working together and making dance films. Ginger became one of the most sought-after and highest paid actors in the 1940s.

Ginger visited her hometown several times during her lifetime. In 1942, she visited the home during an interview with LIFE magazine. In 1964, President Harry Truman declared July 16 to be "Ginger Roger's Day," during a large celebration in her honor. Ginger again visited the home in 1972 when she was in Kansas City to perform [[Tovarich (musical) at Starlight Theater. The mayor of Kansas City presented Ginger with a key to the city during this visit.

On July 16, 1994, the City of Independence hosted Ginger Roger's Day with a parade, book signing, a film festival, luncheon, and dinner. Ginger was presented with a key to the city by Mayor Ron Stewart. The house was declared an Historic Landmark Property by the City of Independence in 1994. Mayor Stewart affixed the plaque to the exterior of the house during Ginger's visit. This was one of Ginger Rogers' last public appearances before her death in April 1995 at the age of 83.

History 
This lot and the one to the West were purchased by Oscar Mindrup in 1906. From the time of construction until 2016, the home was owned by several families, some who are mentioned in the book 100 West Moore Street by Liana Twente and Audrey Elder. The home sat on the market unwanted for months at an asking price of $20,000, then sold to a young couple who lived in the home for 5 years. They sold it in 2016 to Three Trails Cottages, LLC. for $36,500. On February 29, 2016, the home was purchased by Three Trails Cottages, LLC who completed extensive structural restoration work and restored the home to its original condition as closely as possible, preserving the historic features such as the front porch and columns, extensive woodwork, the original corner bathroom sink and clawfoot tub.

Museum 
Visitors enjoyed stepping back in time to the 1910s to 1940s time periods and seeing memorabilia, antiques, movie posters, magazines, photos, and items worn and owned by Ginger Rogers and her mother, Lela. Featured items on display included the gown that Ginger wore to the 1967 Academy Awards, a pair of Ginger's shoes, and the sewing machine that Lela Rogers used to make Ginger's dresses for her Vaudeville acts. Also on display are milk bottles from Ginger's Rogue River Ranch in Oregon, and a tennis racquet Ginger won from a tennis pro. The museum hosts special events throughout the season including a Mother's Day Tea, Ginger Rogers' Birthday, and Hollywood Happy Hour in conjunction with a local winery. The Owens-Rogers Museum is no longer open to the public but will be available as a digital tour in the future.

References

External links 
 The Owens-Rogers Museum website

2017 establishments in Missouri
Houses completed in 1910
Museums established in 2018
Historic house museums in Missouri
Biographical museums in Missouri
Buildings and structures in Independence, Missouri